Orlando International Airport  is a primary international airport that is located  southeast of Downtown Orlando, Florida. In 2021, it handled 19,618,838 passengers, making it the busiest airport in the state and seventh busiest airport in the United States. The airport code MCO stands for the airport's former name, McCoy Air Force Base, a Strategic Air Command (SAC) installation, that was closed in 1975 as part of a general military drawdown following the end of the Vietnam War.

The airport serves as a hub for Silver Airways, an operating base for Avelo Airlines, JetBlue, Southwest Airlines and Spirit Airlines, as well as a focus city for Frontier Airlines. Southwest is the airport's largest carrier by passengers carried. The airport is also a major international gateway for the mid-Florida region, with over 850 daily flights on 44 airlines. The airport also serves 135 domestic and international destinations. At , MCO is one of the largest commercial airports in terms of land area in the United States. In addition, the airport is home to a maintenance base for United Airlines. The airport was also a hub for Delta Air Lines until 2007.

History

Military years 

The airfield was originally constructed as a U.S. Army Air Forces facility and military operations began in 1942 as Orlando Army Air Field #2, an auxiliary airfield to Orlando Army Air Base, now known as Orlando Executive Airport. Orlando Army Air Field #2 was renamed Pinecastle Army Airfield in January 1943. At the end of World War II, Pinecastle was briefly used for unpowered glide tests of the Bell X-1 from B-29 aircraft before the program moved to Muroc Army Airfield in California– now Edwards AFB – for the world's first supersonic flight.  With the establishment of an independent U.S. Air Force in 1947, the airfield was briefly placed in caretaker status, until being reactivated during the Korean War as a Strategic Air Command (SAC) facility for B-47 Stratojets and KC-97 Stratofreighters and renamed Pinecastle AFB.

In the 1950s, the base began hosting SAC's annual Bombing and Navigation Competition. A B-47 Stratojet crashed during the 1958 competition, killing Colonel Michael Norman Wright McCoy, commander of the 321st Bombardment Wing, which was the host wing for Pinecastle AFB. The following year the base was renamed for McCoy.  The base later was home to the 306th Bombardment Wing operating the B-52 Stratofortress and the KC-135 Stratotanker. It was also used by EC-121 Warning Star early warning aircraft of the 966th Airborne Early Warning and Control Squadron, a tenant unit at McCoy assigned to the Aerospace Defense Command.

During the Cuban Missile Crisis in October 1962, McCoy AFB became a temporary forward operating base for more than 120 F-100 Super Sabre and F-105 Thunderchief fighter bombers and the primary base for U-2 reconnaissance aircraft flying over Cuba. One of these U-2s was shot down by Soviet-operated SA-2 Guideline surface-to-air missiles near Banes, Cuba. Its pilot, Major Rudolf Anderson, Jr., USAF, was the crisis' only combat death.  Following the crisis, McCoy AFB hosted a permanent U-2 operating detachment of the 100th Strategic Reconnaissance Wing until 1973.

McCoy AFB was identified for closure in early 1973 as part of a post-Vietnam reduction in force. The following year, McCoy's 306th Bombardment Wing was inactivated, its B-52D Stratofortress and KC-135A Stratotanker aircraft reassigned to other SAC units and most of the McCoy AFB facility turned over to the city of Orlando by the General Services Administration (GSA) in late 1974 and early and mid 1975.  USAF responsibility for the airfield's air traffic control tower was turned over to the Federal Aviation Administration (FAA) and the airport established its own crash, fire and rescue department, initially utilizing equipment transferred by the GSA.

Civil-military years 
In the early 1960s, when jet airline flights came to Orlando, the installation became a joint civil-military facility.

Early jetliners such as the Boeing 707, Boeing 720, Douglas DC-8 and Convair 880 required longer and sturdier runways than the ones at Herndon Airport (now Orlando Executive Airport).  Nearby lakes and commercial and residential development made expansion impractical, so an agreement was reached between the City of Orlando and the United States Air Force in 1962 to use McCoy AFB under a joint arrangement. The military offered a large AGM-28 Hound Dog missile maintenance hangar and its associated flight line ramp area in the northeast corner of the field for conversion into a civil air terminal.  The city would then cover the cost of building a replacement missile maintenance hangar on the main base's western flight line. The new civil facility would be known as the Orlando Jetport at McCoy and would operate alongside McCoy AFB.  This agreement became a model for other joint civil-military airports in operation today.

Airline flights to the Orlando Jetport began shortly after an agreement was signed by the city and USAF in October 1961. Over the next few years airline flights shifted from the old Herndon Airport (renamed in 1982 as the Orlando Executive Airport ). In 1971 scheduled airlines were Delta Air Lines, Eastern Air Lines, National Airlines and Southern Airways. As the years progressed many other airlines have also begun to offer regularly scheduled flights to Orlando Executive Airport, including Spirit Airlines, Copa Air, LATAM Airlines and many more.

The 1971 opening of the Magic Kingdom at Walt Disney World would lead to a significant increase in air travel as Orlando became a major tourist destination.  For much of the 1970s, Shawnee Airlines would directly link MCO with Walt Disney World using de Havilland Canada DHC-6 Twin Otter commuter aircraft. These connecting flights flew from MCO to the Walt Disney World STOL Airport, a small short-lived airfield near the Magic Kingdom's parking lot.  Deregulation of the airline industry in 1978 also contributed to increases in air service to Orlando.

When McCoy AFB closed in 1975, part of the facility stayed under military control to support Naval Training Center Orlando and several tenant commands.

There are only a few enclaves on the original McCoy AFB site that the military still uses such as the 164th Air Defense Artillery Brigade from the Florida Army National Guard in the former McCoy AFB Officers Club complex, an Army Reserve intelligence unit in the former SAC Alert Facility, the 1st Lieutenant David R. Wilson Armed Forces Reserve Center supporting multiple units of the Army Reserve, Navy Reserve and Marine Corps Reserve that was constructed in 2002, and a large Navy Exchange for active, reserve and retired military personnel and their dependents.

Civil years 

In 1975, the final Air Force contingent departed McCoy AFB and the Greater Orlando Aviation Authority (GOAA) was established as a state-chartered local governmental agency and an enterprise fund of the city of Orlando. GOAA's mission was to operate, manage and oversee construction of expansions and improvements to both the Orlando International Airport and the Orlando Executive Airport.  The airport gained its current name and international airport status a year later in 1976, but retained its old IATA airport code MCO and ICAO airport code KMCO.

The airport became a U.S. Customs Service Foreign Trade Zone (FTZ) in 1978, said zone being designated as FTZ #42. In 1979, the facility was also designated as a large hub airport by the FAA based on flight operations and passenger traffic.

In 1978, construction of the current Landside Terminal and two Airsides on the west side of the terminal (known today as Airsides 1 and 3) began, opening in 1981. In 1983 a small chapel was opened memorializing Michael Galvin who died during the construction of the airport's expansion. The original International Concourse was housed in Airside 1 and opened in 1984.  Funding to commence developing the east side of the airport was bonded in 1986, with Runway 17/35 (now 17R/35L) completed in 1989.  Airside 4 opened in 1990 and also contains an International Concourse for the processing of international flights.  Airside 2, which filled out what will become known as the North Terminal complex, was completed in 2000, with the last additional gates added in 2006.  Runway 17L/35R was opened in 2003, providing the airport with a total of four runways.

In 1978, the airport handled 5 million passengers.  By 2018, that number had risen to 47 million. Today it covers 51 square kilometers (19.7 sq mi) and is the fifth-largest airport in the United States by land area after Denver International Airport which covers 136 square kilometers (52.4 sq mi), Dallas/Fort Worth International Airport which covers 70 square kilometers (26.9 sq mi), Southwest Florida International Airport which covers 55 square kilometers (21.2 sq mi), and Washington Dulles International Airport which covers 53 square kilometers (20.3 sq mi). MCO has North America's fourth tallest control tower at 345 feet, replacing two earlier Air Force and FAA control towers.

Orlando was a designated Space Shuttle emergency landing site. The west-side runways, Runway 18L/36R and Runway 18R/36L, were designed for B-52 Stratofortress bombers and due to their proximity to NASA's John F. Kennedy Space Center, were an obvious choice for an emergency landing should an emergency return to launch site (RTLS) attempt to land at KSC have fallen short.  The runway was also an emergency divert site for NASA's Boeing 747 Shuttle Transport Aircraft when relocating orbiters from either west coast modification work or divert recoveries at Edwards AFB, California or the White Sands Missile Range, New Mexico.

Eastern Air Lines used Orlando as a focus city during the 1970s and early 1980s, and became "the official airline of Walt Disney World." Following Eastern's demise, Delta Air Lines assumed this role.

Delta Air Lines began operating a hub at MCO in 1987.  Airside 4, which opened in 1990, was primarily designed for Delta's hub operation and it included a ramp tower, an international arrivals facility, and a wing for regional aircraft under the people mover guideway.  Delta would later pull much of its large aircraft from its hub operations and focused its service there on regional flights via their Delta Connection affiliate Comair.  Comair operated intra-Florida flights as well as flights to other southeastern cities and to the Caribbean.  In 2002, Chautauqua Airlines replaced Comair as the primary Delta Connection carrier at MCO.  Delta closed the Orlando hub entirely in 2007.

Orlando-based AirTran Airways also operated a hub at MCO from 1993 to 2014.  After Delta closed their hub in 2007, AirTran relocated their hub to Airside 4, using some of Delta's former gates which allowed them to double their capacity.  AirTran merged with Southwest Airlines in 2014, which is today the busiest carrier at MCO.

Saudi Arabian Airlines began service to Orlando in 1994. Its seasonal flights to Jeddah proved popular among Saudi tourists. Bookings declined after the September 11 attacks, however, so Saudi Arabian ceased the link.

On February 22, 2005, the airport became the first airport in Florida to accept E-Pass and SunPass toll transponders as a form of payment for parking.  The system allows drivers to enter and exit a parking garage without pulling a ticket or stopping to pay the parking fee.  The two toll roads that serve the airport, SR 528 (Beachline Expressway) and SR 417 (Central Florida GreeneWay), use these systems for automatic toll collection.

The original terminal building, a converted hangar, was described as inadequate for the task at hand even when it was first opened as Orlando Jetport. After its closure in 1981, it passed through several tenants, the last of which was UPS. It was demolished in May 2006.

On February 1, 2010, Allegiant Air began operations at the airport. The company moved one half of its Orlando Sanford International Airport (SFB) schedule to Orlando to test revenue at the higher cost airport. After evaluating the routes out of Orlando, the carrier decided to consolidate and return its Orlando area operations to Sanford citing an inability to achieve a fare premium at Orlando as anticipated, passenger preference for Orlando Sanford International Airport, higher costs at Orlando than expected and a more efficient operating environment at Sanford.

In March 2015, Emirates announced that they would begin daily service to the airport from Dubai International Airport beginning September 1, 2015. The airport had tried to attract Emirates for five years before the service was announced. Orlando International was the first airport in Florida served by Emirates. The airline expects three major markets for the flights: leisure and corporate travelers along with locals of Asian heritage traveling to Asia, which is well-served by the airline. Greater Orlando Aviation Association Chair Frank Kruppenbacher called the new service "without question the biggest, most significant move forward for our airport" and estimates that the local economic impact of the new service will be up to $100 million annually. The inaugural flight was made with an Airbus A380. Regularly scheduled flights operate with Boeing 777-300ERs. Gate 90 was updated in the summer of 2018 with 3 jetways to be able to properly handle the A380, 3 years after the airplane first arrived at Orlando, docking at Gate 84.

On May 18, 2016, the airport launched its own radio station, FlyMCO 105.1 HD2, an FM HD Radio subchannel of WOMX-FM. With the goal of "keeping passengers informed, entertained and aware" FlyMCO 105.1 HD2 provides quick access to up-to-date airport information, local weather, and adult contemporary / top-40 pop music. The radio station can be heard across 11 Central Florida counties (Orange, Seminole, Osceola, Volusia, Brevard, Lake, Marion, Flagler, Polk, Sumter and Putnam), and through WOMX's owner Entercom, is streamable via the Radio.com website/app outside of central Florida.

In 2017, the airport reached 44.6 million passengers, surpassing Miami International Airport to become the busiest airport in the state of Florida.

The Orlando International Airport Intermodal Terminal, which was partially funded by the Florida Department of Transportation, opened on November 17, 2017 and is connected to the Terminal A/B complex by an automated people mover (APM) line. The $684 million station is directly connected to Terminal 3, a new 2,500 space parking garage, and the Orlando station for the Brightline higher speed regional rail service to South Florida. The station reused some of the plans of the Orlando Airport station of the now defunct Florida High Speed Rail project. Phase 1 of the South Terminal Complex includes the new Parking Garage C, the Rail Station, and the 20 gate Terminal C. Phase 1 officially opened in September of 2022, adding several new, and old airlines to MCO’s new terminal.

Future 

The airport is currently building a new terminal south of the Terminal 1/2 complex. In May 2015, the Board of the Greater Orlando Aviation Authority (GOAA) voted unanimously to approve construction of the $1.8 billion South Terminal Complex. The South Terminal Complex will be built adjacent to the Orlando International Airport Intermodal Terminal, which was completed in late 2017 and is connected to the existing terminal by a Automated People Mover (APM) line. At full buildout, the South Terminal Complex will have 120 new gates.

Construction of Terminal C began in 2017, and it was opened on September 19, 2022.

The Orlando International Airport Intermodal Terminal was built to accommodate an extension of the SunRail commuter rail service. The route to the current SunRail line would travel along an Orlando Utilities Commission rail spur, before either branching off to the intermodal station, or have an intermediate transfer point on to light rail to complete the journey to this station.

Multiple options are being considered for a link to International Drive, either with elevated maglev train system, connecting the airport to the Orange County Convention Center, the Florida Mall, and the Sand Lake Road SunRail station, or a light rail link running along a similar route as the maglev alternative between the airport and International Drive.

Facilities

Terminal 
Orlando International Airport has a large main terminal building divided into north and south sides, and four airside concourses accessible with elevated people movers, with a total of 93 gates. International arrivals are primarily handled in Airside 4, with secondary operations occurring in Airside 1 and Terminal C.

Terminal A consists of the northern half of the main terminal, with tramway systems to Airside 1 (Gates 1–29) and Airside 2 (Gates 100–129).
Terminal B consists of the southern half of the main terminal, with tramway systems to Airside 3 (Gates 30–59) and Airside 4 (Gates 70–99).
Terminal C consists of the south terminal complex with gates 230–245 with a pre-security tramway connecting to Terminals A & B.

Hotel 
The airport features an on-site Hyatt Regency hotel within the main terminal structure. The hotel is located on the east side of the Terminal A/B complex with a fourth floor lobby level and guest rooms beginning on level five and above. The airport features an expansive lobby area for guests awaiting flights, convention space, several bars, and two restaurants including a signature restaurant on the top level of the terminal building overlooking the airport facility and runways below.

Airlines and destinations

Passenger

Notes 

 Avelo Airlines flights to Dubuque are temporarily operating to Cedar Rapids due to issues with TSA certification at Dubuque Regional Airport.

Cargo

Statistics

Top destinations

Airline market share

Annual traffic

See also 
B-52 Memorial Park
Florida World War II Army Airfields
Innovation Way
List of busiest airports by passenger traffic
List of tallest air traffic control towers in the United States
Orlando International Airport Peoplemovers

References

External links 

 
Transportation in Orlando, Florida
Airports in Florida
Buildings and structures in Orlando, Florida
Transportation buildings and structures in Orange County, Florida
Airports established in 1940
1940 establishments in Florida
Space Shuttle Emergency Landing Sites